The "Gymnasium Neufeld" in Bern is a state grammar-school of the canton "Bern". An instruction course leads to the grammar-school general qualification for university entrance. This school is popular for its concerts.

List of famous former students:
Johannes Vermathen
Dennis Lüthi

Contents:
1 History
2 Brilliant achievements
2.1 Music
2.2 Art achievements
2.3 Medal winner at the international scientists-olympiad
2.4 Solidaritätsfonds
3 Personen
4 Websides
5 Itemisation

History

Fifteen years after the second world war the quantity of students increased. The "Gymnasium Kirchenfeld" (another grammar school in Bern) wasn't large enough to receive that much children and young adults. The government had to build up a new school. The project begun 1962 and ended in 1965. The architect were Hans Andres and Felix Wyler. The building was built up in the "Laenggasse Quartier" next to the forest named "Bremgartenwald". It was dedicated in 1966.

Schools in Bern